Crawfish Monica is a Louisiana food tradition. Ingredients include pasta (often rotini), crawfish tail meat, onion, garlic, creole seasoning, cream, wine, salt, pepper, and butter. The dish was created by chef Pierre Hilzim who is the head of Kajun Kettle Foods. He named it after his wife Monica Davidson. Parsley can be used as a garnish. Shrimp, crabmeat and oysters can be substituted for crawfish.

References

Louisiana cuisine